Public holidays in Uzbekistan:

Fixed date

Variable date

End of Ramadan, Eid al-Fitr
70 days later Eid al-Adha

References

 
Uzbekistani culture
Uzbekistan
Events in Uzbekistan